Esther Cañadas (born 1 March 1977, in Albacete) is a Spanish model and actress, one of the biggest supermodels from Spain, alongside Helena Barquilla.

Career
Originally, Cañadas wanted to pursue a career as a criminologist, but her mother persuaded her to give modeling a try.

In her teens she started working as a model and moved first to Barcelona, then to Milan and New York.

Cañadas has walked the catwalk for many designers, including Chloé, Gucci, Dolce & Gabbana, Versace, Chanel, Michael Kors, Calvin Klein, Alexander McQueen, Yves Saint Laurent, Valentino, Moschino, Custo Barcelona and Givenchy.

She has appeared in campaigns for the most renowned fashion brands like Versace, Gianfranco Ferré, Armani, Oscar de la Renta, Jean Paul Gaultier, Carolina Herrera, Fendi, Ralph Lauren, Tommy Hilfiger, Dior. She is probably most known, however, for being the muse of Donna Karan and especially for the DKNY campaigns. 

She has been featured on the cover of the most prestigious international fashion magazines like Vogue, Harpe's Bazaar, Marie Claire to name a few. She has worked with the "who's who" of top photographers in the fashion industry, including: Steven Meisel, Helmut Newton, Peter Lindbergh, Richard Avedon, Ellen Von Unwerth, Herb Ritts.  

In 1999 she made her feature film debut with an appearance as "Anna Tyrol Knutzhorn" in the action/romance film The Thomas Crown Affair, starring Pierce Brosnan and Rene Russo.

In 2020 she made her come back on the catwalks for the Gran Finale of the Balmain's show during Paris Fashion Week.

Personal life 
Cañadas met her first husband, model Mark Vanderloo, on the set of a DKNY photoshoot in 1997. They married in 1999 and were divorced in 2000. 
In 2007, she married MotoGP rider Sete Gibernau. They ended their relationship the following year.

In December 2014, Cañadas gave birth to her first child, Galia.

Filmography 
 Trileros (2003)
 Torrente 2: Misión en Marbella (2001)
 The Thomas Crown Affair (1999)

References

External links 
 
 
 AskMen.com Profile
 Vogue interview

1977 births
Living people
People from Albacete
Spanish actresses
Spanish female models
Actresses from Castilla–La Mancha